Nationality words link to articles with information on the nation's poetry or literature (for instance, Irish or France).

Events
 During a visit to Morpeth this year, poet Mark Akenside gets the idea for his long didactic poem, The Pleasures of the Imagination, published in 1744.

Works published

United Kingdom
 Mark Akenside, A British Philippic, published anonymously
 John Banks, Miscellaneous Works in Verse and Prose
 Mather Byles, On the Death of the Queen, English, Colonial America
 Elizabeth Carter, Poems Upon Particular Occasions, published anonymously
 Robert Dodsley, The Art of Preaching, published anonymously
 John Gay, Fables: Volume the Second (see also Fables 1727)
 Samuel Johnson, London, A Poem, on the Third Satire of Juvenal
 Alexander Pope:
 The First Epistle of the First Book of Horace Imitated
 The Sixth Epistle of the First Book of Horace Imitated
 One Thousand Seven Hundred and Thirty Eight
 One Thousand Seven Hundred and Thirty Eight: Dialogue II
 The Universal Prayer
 (see also Pope and Swift, below)
 Frances Seymour, Countess of Hertford (later Duchess of Somerset), writing as "The Right Hon. the Countess of ****", The Story of Inkle and Yarrico, includes "An Epistle From Yarrico to Inkle, after he had left her in slavery", an imitation of Alexander Pope's "Eloisa to Abelard", a part of his Works 1717)
 Alexander Pope and Jonathan Swift, An Imitation of the Sixth Satire of the Second Book of Horace, Pope's contribution was anonymous; Part 1, by Swift, had previously appeared in Miscellanies, "The Last Volume" (that is, Volume 3) 1727
 Jonathan Swift (see also Pope and Swift above), "The Beasts' Confession"
 and Alexander Pope, An Imitation of the Sixth Satire of the Second Book of Horace
 James Thomson, The Works of Mr. Thomson
 John Wesley, A Collection of Psalms and Hymns (first published in Charlestown 1737, see also A Collection of Psalms and Hymns 1741)

Other
 Johann Jakob Bodmer, Critical Disquisition on the Wonderful in Poetry, a defense of John Milton; German-language, Switzerland

Births
Death years link to the corresponding "[year] in poetry" article:
 February 9 (bapt.) – Mary Whateley (married name: Darwall) (died 1825), English poet and playwright
 May 9 – John Wolcot (died 1819), English satirist and poet
 May 27 – Moritz August von Thümmel (died 1817), German humorist and satirical author
 June 5 (bapt.) – Erika Liebman (died 1803), Swedish poet and academic
 June 16 – Johann Christoph Krauseneck (died 1799), German composer and poet
 November 8 – Barbara Catharina Mjödh (died 1776), Swedish poet
 December 4 – Karl Friedrich Kretschmann (died 1809), German poet, playwright and storyteller
 Approximate date – Edward Thompson (died 1786), English Royal Navy officer and poet

Deaths
Birth years link to the corresponding "[year] in poetry" article:
 April – Penelope Aubin (born c. 1679), English novelist and translator
 August 2 – Ueshima Onitsura (born 1661), Japanese haiku poet
 December 19 – Philip Frowde (born c. 1679), English poet and playwright

See also

 Poetry
 List of years in poetry
 List of years in literature
 18th century in poetry
 18th century in literature
 Augustan poetry
 Scriblerus Club

Notes

 "A Timeline of English Poetry" Web page of the Representative Poetry Online Web site, University of Toronto

18th-century poetry
Poetry